Tobias Angerer (born 12 April 1977 in Traunstein, Bavaria) is a German cross-country skier, and skis with the SC Vachendorf club. He graduated from the Skigymnasium Berchtesgaden in 1996. His occupation is "Sports Soldier". Angerer has been competing since 1996.

Biography
Angerer turned 18 in 1995 in his first big event, the 10 km classical at the FIS Nordic Junior World Ski Championships in Asiago, Italy. The next year he took a 26th place on the 30 km freestyle and a 28th place on the 10 km classical at the World Junior Championships in Canmore, Canada.

His first victory in the FIS World Cup came on 6 January 2004 in Falun, Sweden, when he won the 2 × 15 km double pursuit in front of Italy's Pietro Piller Cottrer.

Angerer goes by the name Toby rather than Tobias. He has won the overall FIS World Cup twice, first in 2005/2006 and again in 2006/2007. The first year he won ahead of Jens Arne Svartedal in the second place and Tor Arne Hetland in the third. In the 2006/2007 event, Angerer beat number two, Russia's Alexander Legkov with 551 points and Eldar Rønning finished in third position.

At the 2006 Winter Olympics in Turin, he won a bronze medal in the 15 km classical interval start event and a silver medal in the 4 × 10 km relay.

In 2007 Angerer became the first winner of Tour de Ski men's event, winning by 46.4 seconds over Alexander Legkov.

Angerer has six medals at the FIS Nordic World Ski Championships, with four silvers (Team sprint: 2009, 15 km + 15 km double pursuit: 2007, 4 × 10 km relay: 2005, 2009) and two bronzes (15 km: 2007, 50 km: 2009). Angerer has 22 World Cup podiums and nine World Cup victories, four of the wins which were in 2 × 15 km double pursuit, three in 30 km, one in 15 km freestyle, and one in 15 km classical.

Cross-country skiing results
All results are sourced from the International Ski Federation (FIS).

Olympic Games
 4 medals – (2 silver, 2 bronze)

World Championships
 7 medals – (4 silver, 3 bronze)

World Cup

Season titles
 4 titles – (2 overall, 2 distance)

Season standings

Individual podiums
11 victories – (11 ) 
32 podiums – (28 , 4 )

Team podiums
 6 victories – (5 , 1 ) 
 24 podiums – (15 , 9 )

References

External links

  
 

1977 births
Living people
People from Traunstein
Sportspeople from Upper Bavaria
German male cross-country skiers
Olympic cross-country skiers of Germany
Cross-country skiers at the 2002 Winter Olympics
Cross-country skiers at the 2006 Winter Olympics
Cross-country skiers at the 2010 Winter Olympics
Cross-country skiers at the 2014 Winter Olympics
Olympic silver medalists for Germany
Olympic bronze medalists for Germany
Olympic medalists in cross-country skiing
FIS Nordic World Ski Championships medalists in cross-country skiing
FIS Cross-Country World Cup champions
Medalists at the 2010 Winter Olympics
Medalists at the 2006 Winter Olympics
Medalists at the 2002 Winter Olympics
Tour de Ski winners
Tour de Ski skiers